The Motherwell–Cumbernauld line is a suburban railway line linking Motherwell and Cumbernauld in Scotland. It is part of the Strathclyde Partnership for Transport network.

History
The line was built as part of the:

The line had previously been used by a limited number of through Inter-City passenger trains between Motherwell and Perth up until the end of the 1980s, having earlier served as part of the Caledonian Railway's main trunk route avoiding Glasgow.  The surviving trains (the London Euston to  Clansman daytime through service and the Royal Highlander overnight sleeper) had subsequently been diverted away (via Edinburgh Waverley) by 1990, leaving only the Motherwell–Coatbridge Central section in use by Argyle Line local trains.

In May 1996 the SPT introduced a new timetable on the line, that saw an hourly diesel service through to Cumbernauld alongside an hourly electric service that terminated at Coatbridge Central. Between 1996 & 2000 this was worked by a British Rail class 101.  This allowed the Argyle Line services to be re-routed elsewhere from January 2003(eventually to  via ) whilst offering a new range of journey opportunities for the intermediate stations en route.  A limited number of peak-hour electric services via the Hamilton Circle were retained for commuters and these still operate today.

Infrastructure
The line is now electrified at 25 kV AC overhead throughout - the wires having been extended to Cumbernauld from their former limit at Gartsherrie South Junction (north of ) in the spring of 2014 as part of the Cumbernauld Line electrification scheme. Passenger services are operated by ScotRail on behalf of SPT.

Services
Connections to services on other lines can be made at:
  to the Whifflet Line to 
  to the Argyle Line and services on the WCML, ECML, and North Berwick Line

2006 to 2011
There was an hourly service, usually operated by a Class 156 and calling at all stations.

2011 to May 2014
There was an hourly service, usually operated by a Class 156; however, Class 158 were occasionally sighted. This called at all stations.

May to December 2014
There was an hourly service operated by a Class 318 or a Class 320 as the line had by this time been fully electrified.

December 2014 onwards
The hourly EMU service remains in operation, but now fully interworks with Argyle Line services via the Hamilton Circle west of Motherwell.

There is no Sunday service on the route except on the portion between Whifflet & Motherwell (which is served by trains on the Whifflet Line).

References

Transport in Glasgow
Railway lines in Scotland
Standard gauge railways in Scotland